Day Island is an island,  long and  wide, immediately south of The Gullet and  north of Wyatt Island in the northern part of Laubeuf Fjord, off the west coast of Graham Land in the Antarctic Peninsula. It was first surveyed in 1936 by the British Graham Land Expedition under John Rymill, who gave it the provisional name Middle Island. It was resurveyed in 1948 by the Falkland Islands Dependencies Survey, who renamed it for Vice Admiral Sir Archibald Day, Hydrographer of the Navy.

See also 
 Hinks Channel
 List of Antarctic and sub-Antarctic islands

References 

Islands of Graham Land
Loubet Coast